Even Now is the second and final studio album of Colorado worship band, Foolish Things.

Track listing
"Shooting in the Dark" – 4:52 (Jorgensen)
"Who'd You Put in Charge" – 3:48 (Jorgensen)
"Even Now" – 4:00 (Jorgensen)
"Fly" – 3:46 (Labriola)
"Love Chained Me Here" – 4:30 (Jorgensen)
"Holding On to What is Easy" – 4:18 (Labriola)
"Fight" – 4:04 (Labriola)
"Love Atmosphere" – 4:34 (Labriola)
"Keep Us Together" – 4:23 (Jorgensen)
"Let Go" – 4:57 (Labriola)

Personnel
Isaac Jorgensen – Vocals, Guitar, Songwriting 
James Rightmer – Guitar, Piano, Keyboards, Programming, Synthesizer
Mark Labriola II – Vocals, Guitar, Songwriting
Nate Phillips – Bass guitar
Shaul Hagen – Drums, Percussion
Radical Face – [As the Squirrel]

References

External links
Official Site

2007 albums
Foolish Things albums